For information on all Texas A&M University–Commerce sports, see Texas A&M–Commerce Lions
The Texas A&M–Commerce Lions women's soccer team is the women's intercollegiate soccer program representing Texas A&M University–Commerce. The school competes in the Southland Conference (SLC) in Division I of the National Collegiate Athletic Association (NCAA). For the first 27 years of existence, they competed in the Lone Star Conference of Division II.  The A&M–Commerce women's soccer team plays its home games at Lion Soccer Field on the university campus in Commerce, Texas. The Lions won four LSC regular season championships, three conference tournament titles, and made six appearances in the NCAA Division II Tournament. The team is currently coached by Ashley Gordon.

History 

Women's soccer has been a varsity sport at A&M–Commerce since the 1995 season, during which the school competed as an independent. The Lions subsequently began play as an LSC member when the conference began officially sponsoring the sport in 1996. During the first three years of the program's existence, Mike Munch led A&M–Commerce to two winning seasons and two appearances in the LSC semifinals, albeit no NCAA tournament appearances.

Since beginning conference play, the Lions have won the LSC regular season title on five occasions (in 1999, 2003, 2014, and including co-championships in 2008 and 2016) and the tournament championship four times (in 1999, 2004, 2014, and 2015). A&M–Commerce has also eight seven postseason appearances in the NCAA Division II Tournament, achieving their best result (an appearance in the Elite Eight) during their first campaign in 1999. The program has won all of its championships and made all of its NCAA postseason appearances during the tenure of Neil Piper, who served as head coach from 1998 to 2021.

After the 2021 season, Piper announced his resignation on December 9, 2021. Ashley Gordon was hired as the program's third head coach on January 4, 2022. During their first season in the Southland, the Lions went 7-8-1 during the regular season, finishing third in the conference. In the conference tournament, they defeated the Texas A&M–Corpus Christi Islanders in the quarterfinal round, then shocked the Northwestern State Lady Demons in the semifinal round, before eventually falling to the Lamar Lady Cardinals in the Southland Conference Championship game. This gave them a 9-9-2 record in their first season as a Division I school.

All-time record 

Year-by-year results through the end of the 2022 season

Stadium 

Lion Soccer Field has been the home of the A&M–Commerce Lions women's soccer team since its completion in 1999. Prior to its construction, the land on which it was built had been occupied by a botanical nursery and tennis courts.

At the time it hosted its first game, on September 24, 1999, the venue consisted of little more than a Bermuda grass field, a scoreboard donated by a local business, and a chain-link fence around the perimeter. Over the next decade and a half, Lion Soccer Field benefited from numerous upgrades, including the addition of floodlights to enable the playing of night games (2009), a press box (2011), a permanent black metal fence to replace the chain-link fence (2013), and a new scoreboard (2014). In 2014, the stadium hosted both the Lone Star Conference Tournament as well as two opening-round games in the South Central Region of the NCAA Division II Tournament.

References

External links